Zhang Jun (張駿 Zhāng Jùn; 307–346), courtesy name Gongting (公庭), formally Duke Zhongcheng of Xiping (西平忠成公, posthumous name given by Jin Dynasty) or Duke Wen of Xiping (西平文公, posthumous name used internally in Former Liang) was a ruler of the Chinese  Former Liang state. During his reign, he at times used the Jin-created title of Duke of Xiping, but when forced to submit to Han Zhao and Later Zhao, he used the title Prince of Liang. Late in his reign, even when not under Later Zhao's pressure, he claimed the title of "Acting Prince of Liang." During the brief reign of his son Zhang Zuo, he was honored as Prince Wen of Liang (涼文王). The Book of Jin describes Zhang Jun as having an extraordinary appearance and was talented at literature, however he was also an extravagant and dissipated man.

Early life 
Zhang Jun was the son of Zhang Shi (張寔), the Jin governor of Liang Province (涼州, modern central and western Gansu) and the Duke of Xiping.  In 320, Zhang Shi was assassinated by his guards Yan She (閻涉) and Zhao Ang (趙卬), who were followers of the magician Liu Hong (劉弘), who had falsely prophesied that he would be the ruler of Liang Province.  Zhang Shi's brother Zhang Mao captured and executed Liu and his followers.  Because Zhang Jun was still young (aged 13) at the time, Zhang Shi's subordinates requested that Zhang Mao take over the governorship.  (Because Zhang Mao also declared a general pardon at the time, a power normally reserved for an emperor, this was often viewed as the date of Former Liang's independence from Jin.)  Zhang Mao made Zhang Jun a general, and later in the year named him his heir.  In 324, Zhang Mao died, and Zhang Jun succeeded him.  Because Zhang Mao had previously been forced to submit to Han Zhao and was given the title the Prince of Liang, Zhang Jun carried that title as well, even though internally he used the Jin-vested title of Duke of Xiping.

Early reign 
In 326, Zhang Jun, in fear of Han Zhao, forcibly relocated the people of Longxi (隴西) and Nan'an (南安, collectively roughly Dingxi, Gansu) Commanderies to the capital Guzang (姑臧, in modern Wuwei, Gansu).  He also sought peace with Cheng Han's emperor Li Xiong and further tried to persuade Li Xiong to become a Jin vassal.  Li Xiong agreed to peace and further did not completely rebuff Zhang Jun's overture, but also did not actually become a Jin vassal.

In 327, after hearing news that Han Zhao had suffered losses at Later Zhao's hands, Zhang Jun disavowed all titles granted by Han Zhao and returned to Jin titles, and attacked Han Zhao's Qin Province (秦州, modern eastern Gansu).  Han Zhao's prince Liu Yin counterattacked, and, after defeating Former Liang general Han Pu (韓璞), captured all Former Liang territory south of the Yellow River and further crossed the river, but did not advance further.  However, Zhang Jun did not resubmit to Han Zhao.  As Han Zhao disintegrated and fell to Later Zhao in 329 after its emperor Liu Yao was captured by Later Zhao forces, Former Liang took the opportunity to regain lands south of the Yellow River.  In 330, Later Zhao's emperor Shi Le sent messengers to persuade Former Liang to submit (by granting him honors, including the nine bestowments), but Zhang Jun refused and detained Shi Le's messengers.  Later in the year, however, after Later Zhao's general Shi Sheng (石生) the Prince of Hedong defeated the nearby Xiongnu chieftain Shi Qiang (石羌), Zhang Jun became apprehensive and submitted to Later Zhao.

In 333, in the aftermaths of Shi Le's death and the coup by his nephew Shi Hu, a number of Later Zhao generals rebelled and tried to seek Jin and Former Liang assistance.  Former Liang tried to ally itself with one of these generals, the Di chief Pu Hong (蒲洪).  However, in light of Shi Hu's victory over most of the other generals, Pu soon submitted to Shi Hu.  Shi Hu, however, did not appear to consider attacking Former Liang, and, not having to fight Later Zhao for years, by 335 Zhang Jun's domain was described as being so rich and strong and under his capable leadership that it also became overlord over a number of kingdoms in the Western Regions, which offered tribute to Zhang Jun.  He submitted a plan to Emperor Cheng of Jin requesting to attack Later Zhao and/or Cheng Han jointly with Jin forces, but the plan was not acted upon by Emperor Cheng.

Late reign 
In 339, Zhang Jun transferred some of his authorities to his heir apparent, Zhang Chonghua.  In 340, he offered tribute to Shi Hu, but in his petition he used arrogant words.  Shi Hu was angered and wanted to kill his messenger, but Shi Hu's official Shi Pu (石璞) was able to persuade him to overlook Zhang Jun's arrogance.

In 344, a battle between Former Liang and Later Zhao forces was mentioned, perhaps indicating that the relationship was not as peaceful as before.

In early 346, Zhang Jun attacked the Xiyu kingdom Yanqi (焉耆, in modern Bayin'gholin Mongol Autonomous Prefecture, Xinjiang), and Yanqui submitted to him.  By this point, he was described as having taken the title Acting Prince of Liang (假涼王) and using styles that were usually reserved for emperors.

In summer 346, Zhang Jun died, and was succeeded by his heir apparent Zhang Chonghua.

Era name? 
Most historical sources indicate that Zhang Jun, like his father Zhang Shi and his uncle Zhang Mao, continued to use Emperor Min of Jin's era name Jianxing (both to show continued allegiance to Jin and to distance himself from Emperor Yuan of Jin and his line) but some sources indicate that he changed era name to Taiyuan (太元 tài yuán 324–346).  A current theory is that his era name was used internally while the Jianxing era name was used when communicating with other states.

Personal information 
 Father
 Zhang Shi, Duke Yuan of Xiping
 Wife
 Princess Yan
 Major Concubines
 Lady Ma, mother of Zhang Chonghua
 Mother of Zhang Tianxi, variously reported as Lady Liu or Lady Yan
 Children
 Zhang Zuo (張祚), the Marquess of Changning, later Prince Wei
 Zhang Chonghua (張重華), the heir apparent, later Duke Jinglie
 Zhang Tianxi (張天錫), the Marquess of Changning (created 354), later Duke Dao

Notes

References

Former Zhao people
Later Zhao people
4th-century Chinese monarchs
Monarchs of Former Liang
307 births
346 deaths